Moustafa Ahmed Ismail Abdou Ali Arfah (born 10 June 1953) is an Egyptian footballer who played as a forward. He competed in the 1984 Summer Olympics.

References

1953 births
Living people
Footballers at the 1984 Summer Olympics
Egyptian footballers
Association football forwards
Olympic footballers of Egypt
1976 African Cup of Nations players
1986 African Cup of Nations players
Africa Cup of Nations-winning players
Footballers from Cairo